The So Far, So Good... So What! Tour was a concert tour performed by the American thrash metal band Megadeth to support their 1988 album So Far, So Good... So What!. This was the only tour to feature the lineup of Dave Mustaine on vocals and guitar, David Ellefson on bass, Jeff Young on guitar and Chuck Behler on drums.

Background
The tour began four weeks prior to the release of So Far, So Good... So What!, on December 28, 1987, in Providence, Rhode Island at the Civic Center, and ended August 20, 1988, at the Monsters of Rock festival in Donington Park. Alongside Savatage, the band served as the opening act for Dio from December 28, 1987, to March 26, 1988. Megadeth then embarked on a headlining North American tour, supported by Warlock and Sanctuary, who were promoting their debut album Refuge Denied, which was produced by Mustaine; this was followed by a European run that included support from Testament, Nuclear Assault, Flotsam and Jetsam, and Sanctuary. The band also performed a headlining tour of Japan, and opened for Iron Maiden on selected dates of the latter's Seventh Son of a Seventh Son tour.

Megadeth was scheduled to perform on the Monsters of Rock tour, however after one show they were replaced by Testament. Due to drug problems within the band, they were forced to cancel an Australian tour. Mustaine claimed they had to return to the States because Young "ran out of heroin"; however, Young has disputed this, saying that it was because Mustaine wanted to go back to Los Angeles to seek rehabilitation. In early 1989, several months after the end of the tour, Young and Behler were fired from the band. As a result, most of 1989 was spent searching for a new drummer and guitarist, and Megadeth would not tour again until the following year.

Setlist 
"Wake Up Dead"
"Set the World Afire"
"Hook in Mouth"
"The Conjuring"
"Mary Jane"
"In My Darkest Hour"
"Devil's Island"
"These Boots Are Made for Walkin'" (Lee Hazlewood cover)
"Peace Sells"
"Anarchy in the U.K." (Sex Pistols cover)
Encore
"Mechanix"

Tour dates

Personnel
 Dave Mustaine – guitars, lead vocals
 David Ellefson – bass, backing vocals
 Jeff Young – guitars
 Chuck Behler – drums

References

Megadeth concert tours
1987 concert tours
1988 concert tours